Xombi is a superhero published by DC Comics. He first appeared in Xombi #0 (January 1994) and was created by John Rozum and Denys Cowan.

Fictional character biography
Xombi was a Korean-American scientist named David Kim from West Orange, New Jersey. He developed a nanotechnological virus capable of extensive tissue regeneration. Before David Kim could test his invention, a villain named Dr. Sugarman broke into his lab and tried to steal the virus. In the fight, Kim was critically injured, and his assistant Kelly injected him with the virus in an attempt to save his life. However, since the nanites used available matter to restore Kim, Kelly—who had laid his body on her lap—was partially "devoured" by the nanites. Kim became a "xombi" - a potentially immortal, technologically enhanced human being. This embroiled him in the affairs of various races of supernatural beings that secretly lived among humanity for millennia, known collectively as the shadow worlds.

Post-Infinite Crisis

Due to the combined effect of the destruction and recreation of the multiverse and the timeline-altering powers of Anansi, a new divergent timeline was created in which David Kim, the most worthy man alive, became Green Lantern instead of Hal Jordan. Kim was one of a group of alternate Justice League members who helped restore the original timeline.

Xombi (along with fiancée Dalia Rose and friend Julian Parker) debuted in the DC Universe in issue #26 of The Brave and the Bold, teaming up with The Spectre to fight a ghost which was killing and sucking the lifeforce of other ghosts, vampires, and undead.

Xombi Vol. 2
A second Xombi series debuted in DC Comics in May 2011, and ran for six issues, which were collected in a trade paperback. It was written by John Rozum, with art by Frazer Irving.

Powers and abilities
Virtually immortal and indestructible, the nanomachines in his body prevent aging or disease, and instantaneously heal any injuries he might receive. His body leaves no waste products as his nanomachines recycle every bit of it. Within certain parameters he is able to directly control them and so he is able to disassemble virtually any common material on the molecular level and reassemble it in the form of entirely different materials or other forms.

Supporting characters
Becan - appeared in issue #17, an oracle who David Kim/Xombi and Rabbi Sinnowitz meet in a strange and disgusting bar. 
Bludgeon - of the Beli Mah (School of Anguish).
Catholic Girl - a teenage Catholic School girl who is able to fly, can project a force field around herself when she recites the "Hail Mary", able to fire bolts of energy from her rosary. The origin of her powers is unknown, but she views them as being a heavenly gift. 
Cheryl Saltz - guest-starring from Hardware she works for Alva Technologies, to deduce whether David Kim/Xombi is immortal.
Chet - a friend of David Kim's.  
Cole - a salesman who arranged for Manual Dexterity to murder Lenore Duncan.  
Crowne - the leader of the Beli Mah (school of Anguish).  
Dalila Rose - David Kim's fiancée.   
Dumaka - another Xombi introduced to David Kim/Xombi and Rabbi Sinnowitz in issue #17, by the oracle Becan; Dumaka became a Xombi by African folk magic, he continued to live by means of a regenerating tail. He and David talked of living forever (being immortal) and the truly bad things that come with it; after the talk and David Kim/Xombi and Rabbi Sinnowitz leave, Dumaka gives up the will to live and he dies in issue #18.
ENIAC - the computer, ENIAC, an invention of an old inventor became animated and contacted Cheryl Saltz of Alva Technologies wanting to be connected to the information superhighway, it holds Cheryl Saltz and David Kim/Xombi hostage. David tried an exorcism on the ENIAC, which did not work, but Cheryl managed to stop ENIAC with a little science.  
Homunculi - the Rustling Husks who serve Dr. Sugarman. They were created from remnants of insects that died while trapped between windows, which accounts for their sadistic cruelty when carrying out orders.
Julian Parker - an ally of David Kim/Xombi and Rabbi Sinnowitz; Julian Parker is the son of some demons. 
Kameko - an ancient xombi who appears in issue #17, she had dreams about David Kim/Xombi, she lives in the huge palace with various people; when Kameko and David meet in issue #19, when Rabbi Sinnowitz takes David to meet her, she reveals that she was expecting him because she loves him dearly, they have a long talk concerning the future as Kameko has seen it; the story Kameko tells is one were David destroys the world with his technology. She tells him of the time when they will meet in 80 years. David refuses to accept the future that Kameko describes and leaves maybe to never see her again.   
Kelly Sanborne - David Kim's lab assistant.
Lord of Fumes - escaped from the Garden of Spires at the end of issue #2/beginning of issue #3. 
Manuel Dexterity - the brother of Manuella Dexterity; Manuel Dexterity was sent by Cole to murder Lenore Duncan.
Manuella Dexterity - the sister of Manuel Dexterity, she was  bitter over the death of her brother and decides to kill the Janus (David Kim/Xombi). 
Nun of the Above - a clairvoyant nun who, along with her associate, Catholic Girl, accompanied Xombi on a number of his adventures.  
Nun the Less - a sister in the same religious order as Nun of the Above, Nun the Less developed the supernatural ability to shrink to small size after eating a bad shrimp.  
Rabbi Sinnowitz - an ally of David Kim/Xombi. He is an occult practitioner with penchant for Golem manufacture and control. Rabbi Sinnowitz became involved in the shadow worlds when he and his young wife battled with the Kinderessen, child eaters. The unborn child of Rabbi Sinnowitz and his wife was killed and Rabbi Sinnowitz took up an interest in the occult.  
Rats of Undertown/the Rat Congress - guest-starring from Blood Syndicate associates of the Boogieman (a member of the Blood Syndicate). A riot starts as the rats organize to fight the Kinderessen, the fight took place in the middle of the Utopia Park Riot. 
Sheer Shears - malevolent abstracts shaped like hooded figures with beak-like sheers in place of heads. They are immune to anything that is derived from written knowledge, but they can be destroyed from creative application of oral tradition and folklore.

References

External links
International Heroes: Xombi
International Heroes: Nun of the Above
International Heroes: Catholic Girl
International Heroes: Doctor Sugarman
Xombi's first footsteps in the DC Universe
Reviews of the entire run of the first series at Comics Fondle

Asian-American superheroes
Korean superheroes
Comics characters introduced in 1994
Fictional characters with immortality
Cyborg superheroes
DC Comics characters with accelerated healing
Milestone Comics titles
DC Comics male superheroes
DC Comics titles
DC Comics American superheroes